One Life 2 Live is the third studio album by American rapper C-Bo, released February 4, 1997 on AWOL Records. DJ Daryl and Mike Mosley produced the album. It peaked at number 12 on the Billboard Top R&B/Hip-Hop Albums and at number 65 on the Billboard 200. It features guest performances by B-Legit and Mac Mall as well as labelmate Lunasicc. Along with a single, a music video was produced for the song "Club Hoppin'", although neither performer appears in it. The song, "Survival 1st", first appeared on the No Limit Records compilation, West Coast Bad Boyz II.

Critical reception 

Allmusic – "One Life 2 Live is a funky gangsta rap record in the vein of The Chronic, Doggystyle and All Eyez On Me. Namely, it's the kind of record where the nominal lead rapper, in this case C-Bo, acts more like a ringleader than a rapper, coordinating all of his fellow rappers through a number of party-jams and rarely taking the spotlight himself..."

Track listing 
"Menace" (featuring Mac Mall) – 0:59
"3 Gangstas" (featuring Lunasicc & Maniac) – 4:03
"Ridin On My Bumper" (featuring Lunasicc, Maniac & Da Misses) – 4:20
"I Can't See tha Light" (featuring Marvaless) – 3:59
"I'm a Fool" – 4:16
"Livin Like a Hustler, Part 2" (featuring B-Legit & Lunasicc) – 4:18
"One Life 2 Live" (featuring Lunasicc & Maniac) – 4:13
"Club Hoppin'" (featuring Mississippi) – 3:22
"I'm Gonna Get Mine" (featuring Lunasicc & Marvaless) – 3:59
"Break 'Um Off" (featuring Big Lurch) – 5:30
"Kill Em Up" (featuring Mississippi) – 5:10
"Survival 1st" (featuring Lunasicc & Marvaless) – 4:55

Chart history

References

External links 
 [ One Life 2 Live] at Allmusic
 One Life 2 Live at Discogs
 One Life 2 Live at MusicBrainz
 One Life 2 Live at Tower Records

C-Bo albums
1997 albums